Wushu at the 2011 Southeast Asian Games was held at Istora Senayan, Jakarta.

Medalists

Men's taolu

Men's sanshou

Women's taolu

Women's sanshou

Medal table

External links
  2011 Southeast Asian Games

2011 Southeast Asian Games events
2011
2011 in wushu (sport)